Boy General is a North Korean animated series made by SEK Studio. The show was based on Goguryeo history. The Boy General is one of the most popular animated series in North Korea, the others being such as Squirrel and Hedgehog and Clever Raccoon Dog.

Plot
The brave young warrior Seo-Me defeats the SeoGuk invaders. After defeating Hobi, Seo-Me and his comrades return home. Meanwhile, Hobi survived after falling and some people rescued him out.

Characters
 Seome
 Kukhwa
 Mira
 Yedong
 Nalsae
 Hobi
 Seome's mother
 Hobi's mother  
 Somi 
 Yanguang

Reception
The first series was aired from 1982 to 1997 for 50 episodes. In 2014, the sequel to the show was announced and it started to air in August 2015: 50 episodes have been broadcast, with the final 100th episode being broadcast on 22 December 2019. South Korea netizens were surprised at the quality development of the North Korean animation.

References

1982 North Korean television series debuts
2019 North Korean television series endings
1980s North Korean television series
1990s North Korean television series
2000s North Korean television series
2010s North Korean television series
North Korean animated television series
Mass media in Pyongyang